Pluralism as a political philosophy is the recognition and affirmation of diversity within a political body, which is seen to permit the peaceful coexistence of different interests, convictions, and lifestyles. While not all political pluralists advocate for a pluralist democracy, this is most common as democracy is often viewed as the most fair and effective way to moderate between discrete values. As put by arch-pluralist Isaiah Berlin, "let us have the courage of our admitted ignorance, of our doubts and uncertainties. At least we can try to discover what others ... require, by ... making it possible for ourselves to know men as they truly are, by listening to them carefully and sympathetically, and understanding them and their lives and their needs... ." Pluralism thus tries to encourage members of society to accommodate their differences by avoiding extremism (adhering solely to one value, or at the very least refusing to recognize others as legitimate) and engaging in good faith dialogue. Pluralists also seek the construction or reform of social institutions in order to reflect and balance competing principles.

One of the more famous arguments for institutional pluralism came from James Madison in The Federalist paper number 10. Madison feared that factionalism would lead to in-fighting in the new American republic and devotes this paper to questioning how best to avoid such an occurrence. He posits that to avoid factionalism, it is best to allow many competing factions (advocating different primary principles) to prevent any one from dominating the political system. This relies, to a degree, on a series of disturbances changing the influences of groups so as to avoid institutional dominance and ensure competition. Like Edmund Burke, this view concerns itself with balance, and subordinating any single abstract principle to a plurality or realistic harmony of interests. Pluralism recognizes that certain conditions may make good-faith negotiation impossible, and therefore also focuses on what institutional structures can best modify or prevent such a situation. Pluralism advocates institutional design in keeping with a form of pragmatic realism here, with the preliminary adoption of suitable existing socio-historical structures where necessary. One of the problems plaguing any discussion of pluralism is that it is a multi-faceted concept. There are at least four distinct ways in which the term pluralism has been used.

William E. Connolly challenges older theories of pluralism by arguing for pluralization as a goal rather than as a state of affairs. Connolly's argument for the "multiplication of factions" follows James Madison's logic in engaging groups, constituencies, and voters at both the micro and macro level. Essentially, he has shifted the theory from a conservative theory of order, to a progressive theory of democratic contestation and engagement. Connolly introduces the distinction between pluralism and pluralization. Pluralism, whether the interest-group pluralism of Robert A. Dahl or political liberalism's "reasonable" pluralism, is oriented towards existing diversity of groups, values, and identities competing for political representation. Pluralization, by contrast, names the emergence of new interests, identities, values, and differences raising claims to representation not currently legible within the existing pluralist imaginary.

The common good
Pluralism is connected with the hope that this process of conflict and dialogue will result in a quasi-common good. This common good is not an abstract value or set in stone, however, but an attempt at balancing competing social interests and will thus constantly shift given present social conditions. Proponents in the contemporary political philosophy of such a view include Isaiah Berlin, Stuart Hampshire and Bernard Williams. An earlier version of political pluralism was a strong current in the formation of modern social democracy (to balance socialist and capitalist ideals), with theorists such as the early Harold Laski and G. D. H. Cole, as well as other leading members of the British Fabian Society. In the United States, President Dwight Eisenhower's "middle way" was arguably motivated by a belief in political pluralism.

While advocated by many pluralists, pluralism need not embrace social democracy given it does not a priori assume a desirable political system. Rather, pluralists advocate one based on the pre-existing traditions and cognizable interests of a given society, and the political structure most likely to harmonize these factors. Thus, pluralists have also included Michael Oakeshott and John Kekes, proponents of something close to liberal conservatism (although will often reject such political labels). What pluralists certainly do have in common is the notion that a single vision or ideological schema, whether Marxism or unbridled neoliberalism, is likely too simplistic and rigid to advocate human beings' natural plurality of values. Pluralists likewise reject historicism and utopian thinking. While some, like John N. Gray, repudiate historical progress altogether, others, like Edmund Burke, indicate that human progress has occurred, as a function of improved social harmony.

Conditions
For pluralism to function and to be successful in defining the common good, all groups have to agree to a minimal consensus that shared values are at least worth pursuing. The most important baseline value is thus that of mutual respect, understanding or tolerance. If no such dialogue is possible, extremism and physical coercion are likely inevitable.

Notable pluralists
 Aristotle
 Plato
 Socrates
 Thomas Hobbes
 John Locke
 John Milton
 Rene Descartes
 Spinoza
 Montaigne 
 James Madison
 Alexis de Tocqueville
 early Harold Laski
 Stuart Hampshire
 Edmund Burke
 Joseph De Maistre
 Isaiah Berlin
 Adam Smith
 David Hume
 Edward Gibbon
 Voltaire
 Jean-Jacques Rousseau
 George Washington
 Alexander Hamilton
 Thomas Jefferson
 Thomas Paine
 John Adams
 Sam Adams
 Abraham Lincoln
 Teddy Roosevelt
 Mark Twain
 John Stuart Mill
 Charles Darwin
 Sigmund Freud
 Friedrich Nietzsche
 Thomas Carlyle 
 John Henry Newman
 George MacDonald
 Hilaire Belloc
 G.K. Chesterton
 Robert Hugh Benson
 C.S. Lewis
 J.R.R. Tolkien
 Dorothy Day
 Thomas Merton
 Flannery O'Connor 
 FDR
 James Fitzjames Stephen
 Charles Sanders Peirce
 William James
 Bernard Williams
 William McKinley
 Learned Hand
 later Michael Oakeshott
 Joseph Raz
 John Kekes
 later Paul Feyerabend
 CH Douglas
 John Maynard Keynes
 Karl Popper
 John N. Gray
 Hannah Arendt
 Robert A. Dahl
 William E. Connolly
 Montesquieu

See also

 Anekantavada
 Liberal democracy
 Moderation
 Value pluralism

Notes

References
 Rajiv Krishnan Kozhikode and Jiatao Li, "Political pluralism, public policies, and organizational choices: banking branch expansion in India, 1948–2003," Academy of Management Journal, 55(2), 339–359.
 Pluralism and Liberal Democracy, Richard E. Flatham (2005).
 "Isaiah Berlin"
 Morality and Conflict, Hampshire, Stuart (1983).
 From Pluralist to Patriotic Politics, Blattberg, Charles (2000).
 Democratic platform in Social Pluralism, Kazemzadeh, Hamed (2020).
 Liberty, Berlin, Isaiah (2002).
 In the Beginning Was the Deed, Williams, Bernard (2005).
  "Michael Oakeshott and Modern Conservatism"
  On legal pluralism and communities, see: Gad Barzilai, Communities and Law: Politics and Cultures of Legal Identities. Ann Arbor: University of Michigan Press, 2003.

Pluralism (philosophy)
Political theories
Liberalism
Left-wing politics
Power sharing